The SCU Leavey School of Business is one of the professional schools at Santa Clara University, a private academic institution in the San Francisco Bay Area. The School of Business was founded in 1923 and accredited by the Association to Advance Collegiate Schools of Business thirty years later. Located in the heart of Silicon Valley, the Leavey School of Business provides undergraduate, graduate, and executive education.

History
1851 Santa Clara College established
1923 School of Business and Administration established
1953 Business School accredited by Association to Advance Collegiate Schools of Business
1957 Executive Development Center established
1959 MBA program created
1963 Graduate program recognized through AACSB accreditation
1975 Combined JD/MBA program created
1983 Dedication of the Dorothy and Thomas Leavey School of Business
1999 Executive MBA program created
2008 Lucas Hall business facility dedicated

Academics
The Leavey School of Business, which serves over 2,000 undergraduate and graduate students, has six academic departments including Accounting, Economics, Finance, Management, Marketing, and Operations Management and Information Systems.

Bachelor of Science in Commerce (BSC)
Degrees in Accounting, Accounting & Information Systems (AIS), Economics, Finance, Management, Marketing, Operations and Management Information Systems (OMIS)
Master of Business Administration (MBA)
Different methods of completing the degree Full-Time, Part-Time (Evening and Saturdays), or Executive program
-Joint-degree with School of Law JD/MBA
Master of Science in Business Analytics
Master of Science in Finance
Master of Science in Information Systems (MSIS)
-Joint-degee with School of Law JD/MSIS
Master of Science in Supply Chain Management

Centers & Institutes
"Centers and institutes in the School of Business provide scholars and organizations an interdisciplinary approach to business issues."

Center for Innovation & Entrepreneurship (CIE)
Certified Equity Professional Institute (CEPI)
Executive Development Center (EDC)
Food & Agribusiness Institute (FAI)
My Own Business Institute (MOBI)
Retail Management Institute (RMI)

Ranking
U.S. News & World Report ranked the Leavey School of Business 25th in the U.S. among part-time MBA programs in the "Best Graduate Schools 2018" ranking. This ranking, up from No. 37 the previous year, places the Leavey School of Business 2nd in the Bay Area, 2nd among Jesuit Schools, and 4th in California.

Graduates of the MBA program earn the 9th highest salaries in the nation compared with other MBA graduates according to a PayScale study published in 2016.

The Master's in Finance program was ranked 3rd on the West Coast and 29th nationally in the 2017 Best Finance Program Rankings by The Financial Engineer (TFE) Times.

The undergraduate business program was ranked 63rd in the U.S. by U.S. News & World Report in 2017.  Bloomberg BusinessWeek ranked it 51st in the U.S. for 2016, and in 2013 ranked its macroeconomics sub-specialty 4th in the nation among undergraduate business schools.

For 2021, Santa Clara University was ranked #53 in National Universities. Schools are ranked according to their performance across a set of widely accepted indicators of excellence by U.S. News & World Report.

Leadership
The Leavey School of Business is led by Dean Ed Grier, appointed July 1, 2021.

Previous deans and their tenure:
 Naren Agrawal, interim dean (2020-2021), currently Benjamin and Mae Swig Professor of Information Systems and Analytics
 Caryn Beck-Dudley, dean (2015-2020), President and CEO of AACSB
 S. Andrew Starbird, interim dean (2009-2010), dean (2010-2015), currently director of the My Own Business Institute at SCU
 Barry Z. Posner (1996-2009), professor of leadership and best-selling co-author of The Leadership Challenge
 Alexander Field, acting dean (1995–1996), currently Orradre Professor of Economics
 James L. Koch (1990–1995), currently Don C. Dodson Distinguished Service Professor
 Albert Bruno, acting dean (1988–1989), currently Cleary Professor of Marketing
 Andre Delbecq (1978–1988), currently McCarthy Presidential Professor
 Charles J. Dirksen (1941–1978)

Lucas Hall
Lucas Hall is among the newer buildings on the Santa Clara University campus and is home to the Leavey School of Business. Construction began in May 2007 and the building was formally dedicated on September 14, 2008, in honor of Donald L. Lucas, veteran Silicon Valley venture capitalist.

The three-story building contains 12 classrooms (two dedicated to executive education), 102 faculty offices, 16 team project rooms, six large executive-style conference rooms, and a 100-seat seminar room. The center core of the facility contains the Dukes Business Services Center and the Cadence CyberCafe.

Notable alumni

 Donald Barbieri (1968), former CEO WestCoast Hospitality Corp
 Mary Bitterman (1966), president, James Irvine Foundation, former CEO, KQED Broadcasting
 William Dallas (1987), founder and owner, Dallas Capital
 David Drummond (Google) (1985), vice president and general counsel, Google
 Thomas Fanoe (1968), former president, Levi's USA and Joe Boxer Corp.
 Robert J. Finocchio Jr. (1973), retired director of Informix and former president, 3COM
 Fred Franzia (1965), owner of Bronco Winery and maker of Charles Shaw wine
 John Fry (1978), president and co-founder, Fry's Electronics
 Michael L. Hackworth (1963), chairman, Cirrus Logic
 Richard Justice (1971), senior vice president of worldwide field operations, Cisco Systems
 Walter Kaczmarek (1974), president, CEO, and director, Heritage Bank
 Jack Kuehler (1954), former president of IBM
 Thomas A. Lacey (MBA 1988), CEO and chairman of International Display Works, former VP of Intel
 Thomas E. Leavey (1922), co-founder of Farmers Insurance
 Mike Maciag (1987), CEO, Electric Cloud
 Chris Malachowsky (M.S. 1986), co-founder and senior VP of engineering and operations, NVIDIA
 Rodney Moore (1985), president of the National Bar Association
 David Mooring (1980), former president and director, board member, Rambus
 Peter Oppenheimer (MBA 1987), CFO and senior vice president of Apple Computer
 George Reyes (MBA 1979), CFO, and former senior vice president, Google
 Stephen Schott (1960), former owner of the Oakland Athletics
 John A. Sobrato (1960), billionaire owner and chairman, Sobrato Development Companies
Thomas D. Terry (S.J.), president of Novitiate Wines
 Richard P. Wallace (M.S. 1989), CEO of KLA-Tencor Corporation

References

External links
Leavey School of Business

Business schools in California
Santa Clara University Schools and Colleges
Educational institutions established in 1923
1923 establishments in California